Rasmus Ristolainen (born 27 October 1994) is a Finnish professional ice hockey defenceman for the Philadelphia Flyers of the National Hockey League (NHL). He was selected eighth overall by the Buffalo Sabres in the 2013 NHL Entry Draft.

Playing career
Ristolainen made his NHL debut with the Buffalo Sabres on the opening night of the 2013–14 season, on 2 October 2013, against the Detroit Red Wings. He scored his first career NHL goal later in the month, on 25 October against Jacob Markström of the Florida Panthers. On 5 January 2014, Ristolainen scored the overtime winner in the final of the 2014 World Junior Ice Hockey Championships against previously undefeated Sweden, giving Finland the gold medal. He scored his first NHL hat-trick on 10 December 2015 against the Calgary Flames. In so doing, he became the first Sabres' defenceman to score a hat-trick since Hockey Hall of Famer Phil Housley did so in the 1987–88 season.

On 21 March 2017, Ristolainen delivered a check to Pittsburgh Penguins forward Jake Guentzel. Guentzel suffered a concussion on the play, and Ristolainen was given a three-game suspension for interference by the league.

On 23 July 2021, Ristolainen was traded by the Sabres to the Philadelphia Flyers in exchange for Robert Hägg, a 2021 first-round pick and a 2023 second-round pick. On 10 March 2022, he signed a five-year contract extension with the Flyers.

Career statistics

Regular season and playoffs

International

References

External links
 

1994 births
Living people
Buffalo Sabres draft picks
Buffalo Sabres players
Finnish expatriate ice hockey players in the United States
Finnish ice hockey defencemen
HC TPS players
National Hockey League first-round draft picks
Philadelphia Flyers players
Rochester Americans players
Sportspeople from Turku